Thomas Muster (born 2 October 1967) is an Austrian former world No. 1 tennis player. One of the world's leading clay court players in the 1990s, he won the 1995 French Open and at his peak was called "The King of Clay". In addition, he won eight Masters 1000 Series titles. Muster is one of the nine players to win Super 9/ATP Masters Series/ATP World Tour Masters 1000 titles on clay, hardcourt and carpet.

With his 1995 French Open title, Muster became the first Austrian to win a Grand Slam singles title, followed by Dominic Thiem at the 2020 US Open.

Tennis career

Juniors
Muster first came to prominence when he reached the final of the French Open junior tournament and the Orange Bowl juniors tournament in 1985.

Pro tour
Muster played his first matches at the top-level in 1984, as a junior player, at the age of 16. In 1984, he played his first match for Austria in the Davis Cup. He also played at the 1984 Summer Olympics in Los Angeles, and in two tournaments on Austrian soil, the clay-court event in Kitzbühel and the indoor carpet event in Vienna.

Muster turned professional in 1985, regularly playing in Challenger tournaments throughout the year, winning in Belo Horizonte, as well as continuing to play in many top-level tournaments. Muster won his first top-level tournament at the Dutch Open in Hilversum in 1986.

In 1988, Muster reached six top-level tournament finals, winning four of them, in Boston, Bordeaux, Prague and Bari. Muster finished the year ranked 16th in the world.

Early in 1989, he became the first Austrian to reach the semifinals of the Australian Open, eventually losing in four sets to world No. 1, Ivan Lendl. Shortly after that, he became the first Austrian to reach the world top 10. On the night of 31 March 1989, he defeated Yannick Noah in five sets in the semifinals of the Lipton International Players Championships in Key Biscayne, Florida, to set up a final against Lendl. However, in the early hours of 1 April 1989, just hours after his semifinal victory, he was struck by a drunk driver, severing ligaments in his left knee and forcing him to default the final. Muster flew back to Vienna to undergo surgery. With the aid of a special chair designed to allow him to practice hitting balls while recovering from knee surgery, he returned to competitive tennis in September 1989.

Muster's comeback continued in 1990, when he won three top-level tournaments on clay (including the Italian Open, defeating Andrés Gómez in the semifinals and Andrei Chesnokov in the final) and one title on hardcourt. Muster reached the semifinals of the 1990 French Open, losing in straight sets to the eventual champion, Andrés Gómez. He also helped Austria reach the semifinals of the Davis Cup, where they were eliminated 3–2 by the United States, despite winning both of his singles rubbers against Michael Chang and Andre Agassi. That year, he was named the ATP Tour's "Comeback Player of the Year."

In 1990, Muster won the Austrian Sportsman of the Year award.

Muster won two more top-level tournaments in 1991, and three more in 1992 (all on clay courts), with the biggest of these titles being the 1992 Monte Carlo title, where he defeated Aaron Krickstein in the final. In 1993, Muster won seven titles. Muster's win–loss record on clay in 1993 was 55–10, although he failed to win any of the four big clay-court events of the year.

At both the 1992 and 1993 French Opens, Muster was defeated by the reigning French Open and Australian Open champion Jim Courier. At the 1994 French Open, he won his second round match against Andre Agassi in five sets but was then defeated by the serve-and-volley play of Patrick Rafter in the next round, with Rafter's four set victory denying Muster a match against the reigning French Open champion Sergi Bruguera.

Muster won three clay-court titles in 1994. In March 1994, he defeated Michael Stich of Germany in a first round Davis Cup tie in Graz, 6–4, 6–7, 4–6, 6–3, 12–10, after saving a match point when trailing at 7–8 in the fifth set. Despite Muster's win over Stich bringing Austria level at 2–2 in the tie, it was Germany who eventually won the decisive fifth rubber.

In 1995, Muster enjoyed the best year of his career winning 12 tournaments, with 11 of those tournaments won on clay-courts. Between February and June 1995, Muster won 40 consecutive matches on clay (the longest winning streak on the surface since Björn Borg had won 46 matches between 1977 and 1979). At the 1995 Monte Carlo Masters, he defeated Andrea Gaudenzi in the semifinals, despite struggling heavily in the latter stages of the match due to having a shortage of glucose in his blood and suffering a 40° fever, which required a brief spell in hospital after the match. The next day, he won the final against Boris Becker, after a tough match, by 4–6, 5–7, 6–1, 7–6, 6–0, with Muster surviving two championship points in the fourth set tiebreak, the first of which saw Becker double-faulting after going for a big second serve. He went on to win his second Italian Open title, defeating Sergi Bruguera in the final. At the 1995 French Open, Muster won his first and only Grand Slam singles title, defeating Yevgeny Kafelnikov in the semifinals and comfortably beating 1989 champion Michael Chang in the final. Muster was the only Austrian to win a Grand Slam singles title until Dominic Thiem won the 2020 US Open. His win–loss record on clay in 1995 was a remarkable 65–2. Although his record on other surfaces was less impressive, a late season victory over Pete Sampras on fast indoor carpet, during his run to the title of the Masters event in Germany, gave Muster an outside chance at finishing the year no. 1; however, Sampras finished the year at no. 1. Of the 12 tournaments that Muster won in 1995, Muster saved at least one match point held against him during six of them, with those six tournaments being held in Estoril, Barcelona, Monte Carlo, St. Pölten, Stuttgart Outdoor and Umag.

In 1995, Muster won the Austrian Sportsman of the Year award for the second time.

Muster continued to rack up clay-court victories in 1996. He won seven tournaments, six of them titles he successfully defended after winning them the year before. These 1996 tournament victories included his third Monte Carlo title, where he defeated clay court specialist Albert Costa in the final, and his third Italian Open title, defeating Richard Krajicek in the final. Muster's win–loss record on clay in 1996 was an impressive 46–3. This made his 1995–96 record on the surface 111–5, which was, at the time, the best two-year clay-court record since the open era began in 1968. Despite Muster's continued dominance on clay-courts in 1996, he was upset in the Round of 16 at the 1996 French Open, losing to eventual finalist Michael Stich. In July 1996, in the final of the 1996 Mercedes Cup in Stuttgart, Muster defeated the French Open champion Yevgeny Kafelnikov in three straight sets.

In February 1996, Muster attained the world no. 1 ranking for the first time. He held the ranking initially for just one week, and then regained it for five weeks over March and April 1996. The validity of Muster's number one ranking was called into question by top Americans Pete Sampras and Andre Agassi, who argued that he had achieved the top spot based almost solely on his clay court results, although Muster had beaten Sampras on indoor carpet at the 1995 Masters event in Germany, and Agassi had only won tournaments on hardcourt in 1995.

In 1997, Muster enjoyed the best results of his career on hardcourt. He reached the semifinals of the 1997 Australian Open, losing to eventual champion Pete Sampras. He then went on to win the tournament in Dubai, defeating Goran Ivanišević in the final. Muster went on to win his biggest title on hardcourt at the 1997 Miami Masters, the same tournament where his career had nearly ended eight years earlier, by defeating Sergi Bruguera in three straight sets in the final, after Bruguera had defeated Sampras in the semifinals. Muster was also the runner-up at the Cincinnati Masters, where he lost in the final to Sampras. He achieved a 29–8 win–loss record on hardcourt during 1997, although he only won nine out of 18 matches on clay in the same year. Muster's 1997 French Open campaign ended in the third round, when the unseeded Gustavo Kuerten, then ranked at 66 in the world, defeated him. Kuerten went on to win the 1997 French Open title and usher in a new era on clay.

Muster reached his last top-level tournament final in Estoril (on clay) in 1998, losing to Alberto Berasategui. At the 1998 French Open, Muster reached the quarterfinals, before losing to Félix Mantilla in four sets, with Mantilla getting revenge for his 1998 Italian Open defeat. Muster's 1998 results faded after the spring, as he reached just one semifinal (Mallorca), and one quarterfinal (Boston), for the remainder of the year. Muster opened 1999 with a semifinal showing in Sydney, but then struggled over the next few months, winning just 2 of his 12 matches after Sydney. Following his first-round loss to Nicolás Lapentti at the 1999 French Open, he hung up his racquet at the age of 31. Muster remains the only world No. 1 singles player who has never managed to win a men's singles match at Wimbledon throughout his whole career.

Muster only lost one Davis Cup singles match on clay in his career, when Goran Ivanišević defeated him in April 1997, 6–7, 7–5, 6–7, 6–2, 7–5, despite Muster having won 112 of his previous 117 matches on clay going into the match. Muster's overall Davis Cup win–loss record, counting both singles and doubles matches, was 45–18. Muster's win–loss record in Davis Cup singles matches was 36–8, while his win–loss record in Davis Cup singles matches on clay was 29–1. Muster has more match wins in Davis Cup than any other Austrian tennis player.

After he stopped playing tennis after the 1999 French Open, Muster moved to Noosa Heads, Australia, where he had officially resided since 1996, and married television presenter Jo Beth Taylor in 2000. The couple have a son, Christian, who was born in 2001. Muster and Taylor separated in 2002 and divorced in 2005. In 2003, Muster moved back to Austria, to work as a coach and captain of the Austrian Davis Cup team. He has played tennis on the ATP Champions Tour. In April 2010, Muster married Caroline Ofner, and they have a daughter, Maxim, who was born in 2009.

On 16 June 2010, at the age of 42, Muster announced his comeback to professional tennis. In July 2010, he played the first match of his comeback in a Challenger tournament in Braunschweig, where he lost in the first round. He went on to play in three Challenger tournaments in Kitzbühel, Como, and Rijeka. Eventually, in his fifth Challenger tournament in Ljubljana, Muster won his first comeback match, against Borut Puc of Croatia, which brought Muster back into the ATP singles ranking list at world number 988. Muster finished 2010 ranked at world number 980.

On 13 September 2011, Muster won a second match after his comeback, in the Todi Challenger, against the fifth seeded Argentinian Leonardo Mayer. His next opponent was countryman Martin Fischer, to whom Muster lost. On 19 September 2011, Muster reached world No. 847. He then lost his next match, at the Challenger tournament in Palermo, to Alessio di Mauro.

In October 2011, at the age of 44, Muster decided that he would play his last tennis match before retirement at the top-level Vienna tournament, where Muster lost to countryman, Dominic Thiem, in straight sets. However, three weeks after playing in Vienna, Muster was back again, this time in a Challenger tournament in Salzburg, playing against Dennis Blömke. He lost a close three-set battle. This was his last match to date.

Equipment
During his prime in the 1990s, Muster wore Lotto clothing. From 1986 to 1993, Muster played with the Head Prestige Pro 600 racquet. During the summer of 1993, he switched to playing with the Head Prestige 600 racquet. During 1994 and 1995, Muster played with the Head Pro Tour 630 racquet. At the start of 1996, he switched to using a Kneissl racquet, which was closely modelled on his old Pro Tour 630. At the start of 1997, he switched his racquet again to the white Kneissl Tom's Reach Machine racquet, which had a longer handle and a 28-inch frame. In 1998, he used his Kneissl Tom's Reach Machine racquet on hardcourt, grass and carpet, but went back to his old 1996 Kneissl racquet on clay.

When Muster came back to the ATP Tour in 2010, he used the Head Pro Tour 630 racquet, before switching to the Babolat AeroPro Drive GT racquet, and then went back to the Head Pro Tour 630 racquet again before playing his last matches in late 2011. Muster wore Adidas clothing throughout his comeback.

Records 
In the 1995 season, Muster won 12 men's singles tournament titles, a record for the ATP Tour (since 1990). In 2006 Roger Federer tied the record.

Muster has the highest winning percentage of singles tournament finals of all players who reached a minimum of 25 finals. Of his 55 finals, he won 44 with 11 defeats (80%).

Grand Slam and Masters Series finals

Grand Slam finals

Singles: 1 (1–0)

Masters Series finals

Singles: 10 (8–2)

Career finals

Singles: 55 (44–11)

Doubles: 2 (1–1)

Singles performance timeline

Note: Muster played no professional matches between 2000 and 2009.

1 Held as Stockholm Masters until 1994, Essen in 1995 and Stuttgart indoor from 1996 onwards.

Top 10 wins

Record against No. 1 players
Muster's match record against players who have been ranked world No. 1.

Personal life
Thomas Muster was married to Jo Beth Taylor, an Australian television personality, from 2000 to 2005, having separated in 2002. They have a son, Christian, who was born in 2001. In 2010, Muster married Caroline Ofner and they have a daughter, Maxim, born in 2009. Thomas Muster lives in Styria, a province in southern Austria, and also has a villa on the Adriatic Sea in Croatia.

References

External links

 
 
 

1967 births
Living people
Austrian male tennis players
French Open champions
Hopman Cup competitors
Olympic tennis players of Austria
People from Leibnitz
Tennis players at the 1984 Summer Olympics
Tennis players at the 1992 Summer Olympics
Grand Slam (tennis) champions in men's singles
Austrian expatriate sportspeople in Monaco
ATP number 1 ranked singles tennis players
Sportspeople from Styria